Mitcham was an electoral district of the House of Assembly in the Australian state of South Australia from 1938 to 1993. The district was based in the south-eastern suburbs of Adelaide.

Mitcham was one of just three metropolitan seats (with Burnside and Torrens) won by the Liberal and Country League in 1965 and 1968.

Mitcham is the only single-member lower house seat in any Parliament in Australia to be won by the Australian Democrats.

Mitcham was superseded by Waite at the 1993 state election.

Location
At the 1938 election, the polling places for the district of Mitcham were: Belair, Blackwood, Colonel Light Gardens, Cottonville, Eden Hills, Hawthorn, the Home for Incurables at Fullarton, Mitcham, Rosefield, Unley Park, Upper Sturt, Westbourne Park and West Mitcham.

Members for Mitcham

Election results

See also
 1982 Mitcham state by-election

References

External links
1985 & 1989 election boundaries, page 18 & 19

Former electoral districts of South Australia
1938 establishments in Australia
1993 disestablishments in Australia
Constituencies established in 1938
Constituencies disestablished in 1993